Syed Badrudduja (4 January 1900 – 18 November 1974) was an Indian-Bengali politician, parliamentarian, and activist. He was a member of West Bengal Legislative Assembly, member of Indian parliament Lok Sabha and the Mayor of Calcutta. He was involved with the anti-colonials movements like Khilafat Movement and Civil Disobedience Movement, and was an advocate of Huseyn Shaheed Suhrawardy's United Bengal proposal.

Career
Badrudduja joined and served as secretary of Progressive Muslim League. He worked in the Indian independence movement with Bengali leaders like Chitta Ranjan Das, Subhas Chandra Bose, and Huseyn Shaheed Suhrawardy. He was also associated with Krishak Praja Party. Later, he became president of Independent Democratic Party. He also served as secretary of the Progressive Assembly Party, Bengal, and as president of the Progressive Coalition Party, Bengal. He was the Mayor of Kolkata from 1943 to 1944. He decided to stay in India after the Partition. He was a member of Bengal Legislative Assembly, 1940–46,  Bengal Legislative Council, 1946–47, West Bengal Legislative Assembly, 1948—52 and 1957–62; Member, Third Lok Sabha, 1962—67 and 4th Lok Sabha- 1967-70

Personal life and death 
Badrudduja was married to Rakia Badrudduja. They had children including Syeda Sakina Islam, Syed Mohammad Ali (d. 2010), Syeda Salma Rahman, Syeda Razia Faiz (1936–2013), Syed Hyder Ali, Syeda Aisa Qader, Syed Ashraf Ali (1939–2016), Syeda Fatima Islam, Syed Reza Ali and Syeda Zakia. He died on 18 November 1974.

References

1900 births
1974 deaths
Bengali Muslims
20th-century Bengalis
West Bengal politicians
Lok Sabha members from West Bengal
India MPs 1962–1967
India MPs 1967–1970
West Bengal MLAs 1951–1957
Mayors of Kolkata
Indian independence activists from Bengal
Presidency University, Kolkata alumni
Politicians from Kolkata
People from Murshidabad district
University of Calcutta alumni
20th-century Indian lawyers